Curtas Vila do Conde International Film Festival, created in 1993, is one of the most important cinematographic and cultural events in Portugal dedicated to short-films and annually produced in July, in the city Vila do Conde. The edition of 2011 had more than 20 000 spectators. In 2012 the festival celebrates the 20th Edition.

History

Programmes

Juries

Awards
Main awards from 2011
Great Prize Cidade Vila do Conde - BORO IN THE BOX, Bertrand Mandico, France
Best Fiction - PETIT TAILLEUR, Louis Garrel, France
Best Documentary - GET OUT OF THE CAR, Thom Andersen, United States
Best Animation - WAKARANAI BUTA, Atsushi Wada, Japan
Best Experimental - THE PUSHCARTS LEAVE ETERNITY STREET, Ken Jacobs, United States
Best Music Video - RELEASE THE FREQ – MATTA, Kim Holm, Norway
Best Portuguese Short film - O NOSSO HOMEM, Pedro Costa, Portugal
Take One! Prize - ARTUR, Flávio Pires, Portugal
Curtinhas Prize - ORMIE, Rob Silvestri, Canada
Awards from earlier editions

References

External links
Official Website

Film festivals in Portugal
1993 establishments in Portugal
Vila do Conde
Short film festivals
Annual events in Portugal
Film festivals established in 1993